Ken Olfson (April 2, 1937 – December 31, 1997) was an American film, theater and television actor in the 1970s and 1980s.

Early life
Olfson was born on April 2, 1937 in Dorchester, Massachusetts. He began acting at the age of 10 and was active in Boston Children's Theatre until he was 18. He attended Syracuse University, then studied at the American Theatre Wing. In 1967, he created the role of Dr. Schoenfeld in Bruce Jay Friedman's off-Broadway play Scuba Duba. He was cast as a standby for Charles Nelson Reilly in Neil Simon's God's Favorite, produced on Broadway in 1974.

Career
In 1976, he co-starred on The Nancy Walker Show as Terry Folson, the first gay principal character on American television. In 1978, he appeared on the short-lived series Flying High. Other series included: Mary Hartman, Mary Hartman; One Day at a Time; Happy Days; Charlie's Angels; Eight is Enough; Gimme a Break; Three's Company; Diff'rent Strokes; The Jeffersons; Murder, She Wrote; Trapper John, M.D.; and Amazing Stories. His films included Spaceballs, Mr. Mom, Odd Jobs, and Breakin' 2: Electric Boogaloo.

Personal life and death

After many years of volunteering as a lay counselor at the Southern California Counseling Center, he was given a staff position as the head of the Training Lay Counselors program (TLC) and asked to design it from scratch. This group was well-attended and wildly popular.

He had a twin, Lewy Olfson, who wrote children's books.

Ken Olfson died of a heart attack on December 31, 1997 in Los Angeles after a two-month illness. He was 60 years old.

Filmography

Film

Television

References

External links

 
 

1937 births
1998 deaths
20th-century American male actors
American male television actors
American male film actors
People from Boston